The Riverside Ladies Open was a golf tournament on the LPGA Tour from 1962 to 1964. It was played at three different location in Utah: Willow Creek Country Club in Salt Lake City in 1962, Ogden Country Club in Ogden in 1963, and Riverside Country Club in Provo in 1964.

Winners

Riverside Ladies Open
1964 Clifford Ann Creed

Ogden Ladies' Open
1963 Kathy Whitworth

Salt Lake City Open
1962 Mickey Wright

References

Former LPGA Tour events
Golf in Utah
History of women in Utah